Ohshima Dam is a gravity dam located in Aichi Prefecture in Japan. The dam is used for irrigation and water supply. The catchment area of the dam is 18.4 km2. The dam impounds about 50  ha of land when full and can store 12300 thousand cubic meters of water. The construction of the dam was started on 1980 and completed in 2001.

The height of the dam is 69.4 meters, with a crest length of 160 meters and a dam volume of 183 thousand m3.

References

Dams in Aichi Prefecture
2001 establishments in Japan